Chiang Jin Choon (born 6 November 1956) is a Malaysian former swimmer. He competed at the 1972 Summer Olympics and the 1976 Summer Olympics.

References

1956 births
Living people
Malaysian male swimmers
Olympic swimmers of Malaysia
Swimmers at the 1972 Summer Olympics
Swimmers at the 1976 Summer Olympics
Commonwealth Games competitors for Malaysia
Swimmers at the 1974 British Commonwealth Games
Place of birth missing (living people)
Southeast Asian Games medalists in swimming
Southeast Asian Games gold medalists for Malaysia
Southeast Asian Games silver medalists for Malaysia
Swimmers at the 1974 Asian Games
Southeast Asian Games bronze medalists for Malaysia
Competitors at the 1971 Southeast Asian Peninsular Games
Competitors at the 1975 Southeast Asian Peninsular Games
Asian Games competitors for Malaysia